The following is a list of awards and nominations received by Barbara Hershey.

Throughout Hershey's acting career, she has been nominated for an Academy Award for Best Supporting Actress for the 1996 film The Portrait of a Lady, received three Golden Globe nominations and two Primetime Emmy Award nominations. She won a Golden Globe for Best Actress in a Miniseries or TV Film and a Primetime Emmy Award for Outstanding Lead Actress in a Miniseries or Movie for the 1990 TV film A Killing in a Small Town. At the Cannes Film Festival, Hershey became the first actress to receive back-to-back Best Actress awards, winning for Shy People in 1987 and A World Apart in 1988.

In 2010, a resurgence in her career took place when she co-starred as The Queen in Black Swan. Hershey was nominated for her second BAFTA Award for Best Actress in a Supporting Role; and along with the cast of the film, was nominated for her first Screen Actors Guild Award for Outstanding Performance by a Cast in a Motion Picture.

Major associations

Academy Awards

BAFTA Awards

Golden Globe Awards

Primetime Emmy Awards

Screen Actors Guild Awards

Industry awards

Fangoria Chainsaw Awards

Satellite Awards

Major festival awards

Cannes Film Festival

Critics awards

Chicago Film Critics Association Awards

Los Angeles Film Critics Association Awards

National Society of Film Critics Awards

New York Film Critics Circle Awards

References

External links

Hersey, Barbara